My Babysitter's a Vampire (released as My Babysitter's a Vampire: The Movie in some regions) is a 2010 Canadian comedy horror television film directed by Bruce McDonald. It stars Vanessa Morgan and Matthew Knight. The film's plot centers on a group of teenagers, one of them a vampire unwittingly hired by a couple to babysit their daughter in lieu of their somewhat untrustworthy son, and their efforts to foil a plot to resurrect a cult group of dead vampires.

The movie aired on October 9, 2010, on the Canadian television channel Teletoon. The French version of the film aired on Teletoon's French-Canadian counterpart, Télétoon, on October 16, 2010. It premiered in the United States on Disney Channel June 10, 2011.

Plot
Ethan Morgan is a geeky high school freshman, not trusted by his parents to take care of his little sister Jane on his own. They hire Erica, a teenage girl from Ethan's school who is a huge fan of Dusk (a parody of Twilight), as a babysitter. Erica instead decides to attend a party thrown by Jesse, the vampire ex-boyfriend of her best friend Sarah. During a fight between Sarah and Jesse, Sarah ends up at Ethan's house and tells Ethan's parents that she was asked to babysit instead. Ethan becomes infatuated with Sarah. Ethan suddenly has a vision when touching Sarah, and notices she has no reflection in the mirror.

Sarah leaves to get Erica back from the party, knowing the party is full of bloodthirsty vampires. Curious, Ethan and his dorky best friend Benny follow Sarah. They see her feed on a rat and realize she is a vampire. Sarah explains that she is only a fledgling, a vampire who has not drunk human blood. The three of them are attacked by a vampire sent by Jesse, and head to the party to save Erica and their dimwitted friend, Rory. However, Erica has already been bitten and also bites Rory.

The next day, Ethan has a vision in which he sees a gravestone with the number 219 and a mysterious box, which is then uncovered by the vampires. The box is called the Cubile Animus or "Nest of Souls". Ethan and Sarah figure out Jesse's plan from an old book, learning that in the original settlement of the town, a man named Reverend Horace Black led an evil cabal of vampires. During a lunar eclipse, the townspeople burned the members, leading to all '219' of their deaths. Ethan realizes that Jesse is, in fact, Horace Black, and plans to use the box to trap the souls of teens going to see the premiere of the new Dusk movie so he can resurrect the souls of his ancient group during the lunar eclipse.

Benny's grandmother, who reveals that she is an Earth Priestess, gives Ethan, Benny and Sarah enchanted daggers and a spell book to defeat the vampires. She explains that Ethan sees visions because he is a Seer, which enables him to see visions through touch, and Benny is a spellmaster, allowing him to cast spells. At the theater, the vampires begin to steal the souls of the teens, but are thwarted by the trio. In a vision, Ethan sees the tree he saw inside the old book, realizing it's the tree in his backyard, where they find Jesse. As the eclipse begins, Jesse attempts to hold Ethan and Benny down and resurrect the souls he already obtained from the Cubile Animus, but Sarah intervenes. When the box lands in Ethan's hands, he releases the vengeful souls that were captured, which destroy Jesse and return to their bodies.

The next day, Ethan, Benny and Sarah meet Erica and Rory, who have decided to live peacefully as vampires.

Cast

Broadcast

The movie originally premiered on Teletoon on October 9, 2010, and on Télétoon on October 16, 2010. In the United States it premiered on June 10, 2011, and in the UK and Ireland on October 3, 2011.

Television series

A television series based on the film has been produced. It was created by Fresh TV, creators of 6teen and Total Drama. The first four episodes of the series aired on Teletoon (English) from March 14, 2011, to March 17, 2011 and on Télétoon (French) from February 28, 2011, to March 3, 2011. The series formally premiered in Canada on January 5, 2011, on both channels. The series premiered on Disney Channel on June 27, 2011, in the United States, and the channel aired all the episodes of the first season in the US before they premiered in Canada. The first season officially premiered in Canada on January 5, 2012. It was produced by Fresh TV.

Season 2 of the show has been greenlit by Fresh TV, and was originally revealed by Vanessa Morgan on her official, personal Twitter. Filming began on September 21, 2011, to November 17, 2011. The same day filming ended, Disney Channel announced they would pick it up for a second season. The second season first premiered on Disney Channel in the US on June 29, 2012. It made its premiere on Teletoon in Canada on September 6, 2012. The series is currently on hiatus as of April 2013, but a second movie is being planned.

Reception

Critical response

Pretty Famous gave it a smart rating of 82.

Ratings
On its original airing on June 10, 2011, on Disney Channel in the United States, the TV film pulled approximately 4.18 million total viewers and 0.6 rating in the age 18-49 demographic, ranking in seventh place in that age demographic but leading that night in top total viewers.

Awards and nominations

See also
 Vampire film

References

External links
 
 

2010 television films
2010 films
2010s adventure films
2010s comedy horror films
2010 fantasy films
Canadian horror television films
English-language Canadian films
Films directed by Bruce McDonald
Television films as pilots
Vampire comedy films
Canadian comedy television films
Fantasy television films
Vampires in television
Canadian comedy horror films
2010s Canadian films